Hartman is a city in Johnson County, Arkansas, United States. The population was 519 at the 2010 census.

Geography
U.S. Highway 64 passes through the center of town, leading east  to Clarksville, the county seat, and west  to Ozark.

Demographics

At the 2000 census, there were 596 people, 234 households and 181 families residing in the city. The racial makeup of the city was 98.32% White, 1.01% Native American, 0.50% from other races, and 0.17% from two or more races. 1.68% of the population were Hispanic or Latino of any race.

There were 234 households, of which 30.8% had children under the age of 18 living with them, 62.4% were married couples living together, 10.3% had a female householder with no husband present, and 22.6% were non-families. 21.4% of all households were made up of individuals, and 11.1% had someone living alone who was 65 years of age or older. The average household size was 2.55 and the average family size was 2.92.

Age distribution was 24.3% under the age of 18, 7.6% from 18 to 24, 29.9% from 25 to 44, 22.3% from 45 to 64, and 15.9% who were 65 years of age or older. The median age was 36 years. For every 100 females, there were 98.7 males. For every 100 females age 18 and over, there were 97.8 males.

The median household income was $22,891, and the median family income was $24,821. Males had a median income of $27,500 versus $18,750 for females. The per capita income for the city was $15,188. About 24.2% of families and 25.5% of the population were below the poverty line, including 45.9% of those under age 18 and 26.4% of those age 65 or over.

Education
Westside School District serves Hartman.

References

Cities in Johnson County, Arkansas